Trick is the fourth album by Londoner indie rock artist Jamie T, released on 2 September 2016 through Virgin Records and Harvest Records. The first single from the album was "Tinfoil Boy", which was first played on Annie Mac's Radio 1 show on 29 June, and was released for download on 30 June. The second single from the album, "Power Over Men", was first played as Annie Mac's 'Hottest Record in the World' on 9 August, and was made available on streaming services the following day. On 30 August, Annie Mac also played 2 of the album tracks - "Tescoland" and "Sign of the Times", and on the same day Zane Lowe premiered the album track "Drone Strike" on Beats 1, which was made available on streaming services the following day. The album was released in full at midnight on 2 September.

To promote the album, Jamie T embarked on an extensive 18-date tour of the UK and Ireland, including 3 nights at London's Brixton Academy.

The album artwork is the 1843 Paul Falconer Poole work entitled "Solomon Eagle", which depicts the English composer and Quaker Solomon Eagle - the subject of track 8 on the album.

Reception

Trick has been greeted with enthusiasm by music critics, with many praising the diversity of genres on the album. The album holds a rating of 78 out of 100 on review aggregator website Metacritic based on 13 reviews.

Accolades

Track listing

Charts

References

2016 albums
Jamie T albums
Virgin Records albums